Guilty Gear Petit is a sub-series of fighting video games, spin-offs of the Guilty Gear series, directed by Emiko Iwasaki and released for the Japan-only handheld WonderSwan Color.

Guilty Gear Petit 

 is the first handheld version of the Guilty Gear series released. It is followed by the sequel Guilty Gear Petit 2. Much like Super Gem Fighter Mini Mix, it depicts the Guilty Gear characters in a super deformed style. It is also notable for the inclusion of the character Fanny, who appears only in the two Guilty Gear Petit games. The game has seven playable characters, six of which are from other Guilty Gear series games. The game was only released in Japan.

Guilty Gear Petit 2 

The sequel  was released eight months after the first. The game has 13 regular characters, a secret character (Testament), and four "Golden" characters (GGMillia, GGKy, GGSol, and GGMay). The game was only released in Japan for the WonderSwan Color.

Characters

External links
 
 Guilty Gear Petit on GameSpot

2001 video games
Arc System Works franchises
Arc System Works games
Guilty Gear games
Japan-exclusive video games
WonderSwan Color games
Sammy games
Video games developed in Japan